Which Bitch? is the second album from Scottish band The View which was released 2 February 2009. Paolo Nutini guests on the track "Covers". "Gem of a Bird" is about Kyle Falconer's girlfriend Katie Gwyther, with whom the song is a duet.

The album received mixed reviews from critics and debuted at number 4 on the official UK Albums chart in its first week of release, but in stark contrast to its predecessor Hats Off to the Buskers it dropped down the charts quickly and spent two weeks in the UK top 40; it fell to No. 27 in its second week before dropping out altogether. Three singles were released from the album but all failed to reach the top 40; "5 Rebbecca's" and "Shock Horror" charted at No. 57 and #64 respectively. The album's third single "Temptation Dice" did not chart.

Track listing
All songs written by Falconer/Webster 

 "Typical Time 2" – 1:36
 "5 Rebecca's" – 3:50
 "One Off Pretender" – 3:29
 "Unexpected" – 3:39
 "Temptation Dice" – 3:47
 "Glass Smash" – 4:20
 "Distant Doubloon" – 4:36
 "Jimmy's Crazy Conspiracy" – 3:47
 "Covers" – 3:23
 "Double Yellow Lines" – 4:09
 "Shock Horror" – 4:07
 "Realisation" – 3:41
 "Give Back the Sun" – 5:54
 "Gem of a Bird" – 3:32

Chart performance

References

2009 albums
The View (band) albums
Albums produced by Owen Morris